I'll Be Thinking of You is a 1979 Gospel album by Andraé Crouch, released on the Elektra and Light record labels. The album won a Grammy Award for Best Contemporary Soul Gospel Album.

Overview
Artists such as Stevie Wonder and Philip Bailey appeared on the album.

Track listing

Personnel

Musicians 

Dorothy Ashby               – harp
Philip Bailey           – vocals, background vocals, soloist
Bea Carr                    – background vocals
Larry Carlton - guitar
Lenny Castro            - percussion
Andraé Crouch           – keyboards, marimba, vocals, background vocals, soloist
Sandra Crouch               – percussion, background Vocals
Marvin "Tuffy" Cummings     – background vocals
Mike Escalante - synthesizer
James Felix                 – background vocals
Tommy Funderburk            – background vocals
Tammie Gibson               – background vocals
Jay Graydon             – guitar
Danniebelle Hall            – vocals, soloist
Kathy Hazzard               – background vocals
Rev. Patrick Henderson      – keyboards
Hadley Hockensmith          – bass, guitar, soloist
David Hungate               – bass
Abraham Laboriel            – bass
Bill Maxwell                – drums, percussion
Marty McCall                – background vocals
Dorothy Ashby               – background vocals
Alfred McCrary              – background vocals
Charity McCrary             – trumpet
Howard McCrary              – keyboards, background vocals, synthesizer bass
Linda McCrary               – background vocals
David Miner                 – bass
Perry Morgan                – background vocals
Kristle Murden              – vocals, background vocals, soloist
Glen Myerscough             – saxophone
Kenneth Nash                – percussion
Michael Omartian            – keyboards
Lance Ong                   – synthesizer
Dean Parks                  – guitar
Billy Preston               – keyboards
Harlan Rogers             – keyboards, arrangements
Phyllis St. James         – background vocals
Joe Sample                  – keyboards
David Shields              – bass
Leland Sklar                – bass
Howard Smith                – vocals, background vocals, soloist
Steve Tavaglione            – saxophone
Rodney Wayne                – background vocals
David Williams           – guitar
Stevie Wonder               – harmonica

Production 

Andraé Crouch – Arranger, Producer, Vocal Arrangement, Mixing
Bob Cotton – Engineer, Mixing
John Guess – Engineer
Peter Haden – Assistant Engineer
Al Schmidt Jr – Assistant Engineer
Bill Maxwell                – Producer, Vocal Arrangement, Mixing
Howard McCrary              – Vocal Arrangement
Glenn Meadows               – Digital Mastering, Reissue Mastering
Glen Myerscough             – Horn Arrangements
Ross Pallone                – Assistant Engineer
Ken Perry – Mastering
Harlan Rogers               – Arranger
Gordon Shryock              – Engineer, Mixing
Lennart Sjöholm             – String Arrangements

Charts

References

1979 albums
Andraé Crouch albums
Elektra Records albums